Lonely Are the Brave is the debut studio album by English/Irish vocalist/rapper Maverick Sabre. The album was first released on 27 January 2012 in Ireland, which was succeeded by a release in the United Kingdom on 6 February 2012. Three singles preceded its release, "Let Me Go" (July 2011), "I Need" (November 2011) and "No One" (February 2012). Lonely Are the Brave debuted at number-two on the UK Albums Chart with first-week sales of 44,292 copies, also peaking at number two on the Scottish Albums Chart and number three on the Irish Albums Chart.

It has sold 251,020 copies as of November 2015.

Background
Speaking in December 2011, Sabre explained his reasons for titling the album 'Lonely Are The Brave': "'Lonely Are The  Brave' was actually the title of an old movie that I first heard about when I was really young - around 12 or 13 - and I actually thought the feeling captured in that one phrase was amazing, because I feel everybody at some point in their lives needs to be brave to get through loneliness. And, because I thought it also summed up a lotta the emotion behind this album - particularly in terms of where I was at when I was writing a lotta the songs - I just felt as a title it fitted the project really well."

Critical reception
Digital Spy gave the album 4 stars out of 5 stars - "But while his voice may sound part-Amy Winehouse, part-Daniel Merriweather, few could accuse him of leaning on others [...] his first collection of self-penned tracks is both brutally opinionated and unnervingly honest."

Singles
"Let Me Go" was first released in the United Kingdom on 22 July 2011 as the lead single from Lonely Are the Brave. It debuted at number sixteen on the UK chart, marking Sabre's second top forty single after "Jungle"; which peaked at number thirty-one. The song also peaked at number thirty-eight on the Irish chart and number twenty-seven on the Scottish chart. The track was succeeded by "I Need", first released as the second single from Lonely Are the Brave on November 4, 2011. "I Need" debuted at number eighteen on the UK chart, Sabre's second consecutive release to achieve this feat, also peaking at number thirty-two on the Irish chart and number twenty-four on the Scottish chart - higher than the peak of the previous release. A third single, "No One", was released in the UK on 5 February 2012 to coincide with the album release. The single failed to chart in Ireland and Scotland, despite debuting at number fifty on the UK chart. A fourth single, "I Used To Have It All", was released in the UK on 30 April 2012. The fifth single "These Days" was released on 2 July 2012.

Track listing

Charts

Weekly charts

Year-end charts

Release history

References

2012 debut albums
Maverick Sabre albums
Mercury Records albums